"Babylon" is the sixth episode of the first season of the American television drama series Mad Men. It was written by Andre and Maria Jacquemetton and directed by Andrew Bernstein. The episode originally aired on the AMC channel in the United States on August 23, 2007.

Plot
Don prepares breakfast in bed for Betty to celebrate Mother's Day but trips and falls down  the stairs. Don then has a vision of himself as a child, meeting his newborn half-brother Adam for the first time. Don and Betty then snuggle up in bed and talk about Joan Crawford. Betty is shocked at how "old" Crawford looks,  but Don chides her to not be melancholic when her thoughts turn to her recently deceased mother. He says that "mourning is just extended self-pity."

The next day at Sterling Cooper, Don and his co-workers meet with executives from the Israeli Board of Tourism to discuss marketing strategies. Don, unsure of what strategy to use, meets Rachel Menken for lunch under the guise of asking her for input because she is Jewish. She keeps their meeting professional, but later she confesses on the phone to her sister that she is developing feelings for Don.

Meanwhile, Roger meets Joan in a hotel room to continue what is revealed to be a long-running affair. Roger wishes that he could have Joan all to himself, and suggests that she get her own apartment. Joan refuses, saying that she will be looking for a more permanent situation and suspects that Roger will eventually leave her for someone younger.

Freddy Rumsen, working on a campaign for Belle Jolie lipstick, does some research by having the secretaries of Sterling Cooper try out new varieties of lipstick. While the secretaries sample the merchandise, the men of the company spy on them from behind a one-way mirror. While most of the women enjoy trying out the samples, Peggy sits by herself, watching. After the event is over, she tells Freddy that she does not want to feel "like one of a hundred colors in a box" and refers to a trashcan full of discarded samples as a "basket of kisses". Impressed, Freddy relays Peggy's comments to the rest of the creative team and expresses the idea that she may have some writing talent. He says listening to her brainstorm was "like watching a dog play the piano". Freddy asks Peggy to write some copy for the account.

Don drops by Midge's apartment, but they are interrupted by Midge's beatnik friend Roy, who ribs Don for his age and routine suburban life. The three of them go to The Gaslight Cafe to watch Midge's friend perform. Roy continues to antagonize Don, criticizing the emptiness of advertising and mass consumption while Don ridicules Roy for his vanity and flightiness. They are silenced when Midge's friend takes the stage and performs a song about the Jews' mourning their exile from Zion in Babylon.

Elsewhere, Roger presents Joan with a gift—a bird in a cage. He expresses regret that he has to share her. Joan is taken aback by the gift, and appears to be conflicted about their relationship. As the song continues, Joan and Roger leave the hotel and, posing as strangers to avoid suspicion, wait for separate cabs.

Cultural references
Don reads The Best of Everything and later he and Betty discuss the film adaptation. Don and his co-workers also read and discuss the novel Exodus as research. Sal refers to a shade of lipstick as "Ethel Rosenberg pink." Rachel refers to the then-recent capture of Adolf Eichmann.

Don asks Rachel to lunch, and she suggests the tea room at The Pierre. While The Pierre is a real hotel in New York (and, as of 2019, has been in continuous operation since 1930), it doesn't have any eatery that would be referred to as a "tea room", and Don & Rachel's lunch scene was not shot at the Pierre.

The song Babylon (Psalm 137 as arranged by Philip Hayes) has the same arrangement as Don McLean version on his album American Pie from 1971, which is the earliest known release of it.

Reception
The episode was received very positively by critics. Alan Sepinwall, writing for New Jersey's The Star-Ledger, praised its focus on the show's female characters, and in particular the progression of Peggy's story. Andrew Johnston, writing for Slant Magazine, considered it the show's "most entertaining" episode to date, and wrote that its ending "beautifully demonstrates the level of insight that makes Mad Men so special."

In December 2013, Emily VanDerWerff of The A.V. Club gave the episode a full "A" grade, writing retrospectively:The episode includes the first major story for Joan, a triumph for Peggy, and a minor but hugely important story point for Rachel. It features Midge for a brief time, and it gives us a taste of both Betty’s view of the world (which seems haunted by her fear that her looks will fade) and the glimmerings of what relationship she has with Sally. It’s the first episode of the show that functions more or less as a guided tour of the women of Mad Men, and that’s a mode that the show would return to at least once per season for as long as it ran [...] They’re all struggling toward Utopia, a good place yet also a place that cannot be.

References

External links
"Babylon" at AMC

Mad Men (season 1) episodes
2007 American television episodes